Chardon Local School District is a school district which serves part of Geauga County, Ohio, United States. It is based in Chardon, Ohio.

Vision 2020
|PDF

Schools
It operates the following schools:
Chardon High School
Chardon Middle School
Chardon Early Learning Center
Munson Elementary School
Park Elementary School

References

External links

School districts in Ohio
Education in Geauga County, Ohio
Local School District